Marta Godinho (born 24 June 1980) is a Portuguese long jumper.

She finished tenth at the 2001 IAAF World Indoor Championships in Lisbon.

References

External links
IAAF profile for Marta Godinho

1980 births
Living people
Portuguese female long jumpers